Balls is the second EP by the Huntington Beach, California punk rock band Guttermouth, released in 1991 by Dr. Strange Records. It is currently out of print, however all of the tracks were re-issued on the CD re-releases of the band's debut album Full Length LP in 1992 and 1996.

Track listing
All songs written by Guttermouth
Side 1
"Under My Skin"
Side 2
"Gas Out"
"No Such Thing"

Personnel
Mark Adkins - vocals
Scott Sheldon - guitar
Eric "Derek" Davis - guitar
Clint "Cliff" Weinrich - bass
James Nunn - drums

Album information
Record label: Dr. Strange Records
Recorded at Westbeach Recorders April 1991 by Donnell Cameron and Joe Peccorillo

References

Guttermouth EPs
1991 EPs
Dr. Strange Records EPs